Antoni Gaudí was an architect from Catalonia, Spain, who belonged to the Modernisme (Art Nouveau) movement. He was famous for his unique style and highly individualistic designs.

As an architecture student at the Escola Tècnica Superior d'Arquitectura in Barcelona from 1873 to 1877, Gaudí achieved only mediocre grades, but he did well in his "trial drawings and projects." After five years of work and schooling, Gaudi qualified as an architect in 1878.

As Elies Rogent signed Gaudí's degree he declared, "Qui sap si hem donat el diploma a un boig o a un geni. El temps ens ho dirà." ("Who knows if we have given this diploma to a nut or to a genius. Time will tell.")

Gaudi immediately began to plan and design. He remained affiliated with the school his entire life.

Built in Gaudí's lifetime
Dates refer to the period Gaudí was involved in the construction phase of the building.

Building designs 
Designs of buildings that were not, or at least not fully, realised during the architect's life. Dates refer to the period Gaudí was involved with the design.

UNESCO World Heritage Site 

Seven (parts of) buildings are included in UNESCO's World Heritage Site No. 320bis, Works of Antoni Gaudí, all of them located in the Province of Barcelona:
Parque Güell
Palacio Güell
Casa Mila
Casa Vicens
Nativity Façade and Crypt of the Sagrada Familia
 *Other parts of the Sagrada Familia, including the Sagrada Família Schools, are included in the buffer zone of the 5th part of the WHS site.
Casa Batlló
Crypt at the Colònia Güell
Buffer zone includes part of the Colònia Güell and the

References

External links

 
Gaudi
Gaudi
World Heritage Sites in Catalonia